The College of Engineering is one of the six colleges of the Kwame Nkrumah University of Science and Technology, in Kumasi, Ghana. It was established in October 1952 to prepare students for professional qualifications only. It has since grown and expanded and now as a college runs 15 BSc, 20 MSc, MPhil and PhD programmes under 3 faculties; the faculty of Electrical and Computer Engineering, the faculty of Civil and Geo Engineering and the faculty of Mechanical and Chemical Engineering and 10 academic departments.

Academics 
The College of Engineering offers undergraduate programmes leading to the award of a Bachelor of Science degree as well as postgraduate programmes leading to the award of MSc, MPhil or PhD degrees.

BSc Programmes 

 Aerospace Engineering
Agricultural and Biosystems Engineering
 Automobile Engineering
 Geomatic Engineering
 Biomedical Engineering
 Chemical Engineering
 Civil Engineering
 Computer Engineering
 Electrical/Electronic Engineering
 Geological Engineering
 Industrial Engineering
 Materials Engineering
 Marine Engineering
 Mechanical Engineering
 Metallurgical Engineering
 Petroleum Engineering
 Petrochemical Engineering
 Telecommunication Engineering

MSc Programmes
 Chemical Engineering
 Environmental Resources Management
 Thermo Fluids
 Design and Production
 Applied Mechanics
 Soil and Water Engineering
 Food and Postharvest Engineering
 Agricultural Machinery Engineering
 Agro-Environmental Engineering
 Telecommunication Engineering
 Water Supply and Environmental Sanitation
 Water Resources Engineering and Management
 Road and Transportation Engineering

Departments 

 Agricultural Engineering
 Chemical Engineering
 Civil Engineering
 Computer Engineering
 Electrical and Electronic Engineering
 Geological Engineering	
 Geomatic Engineering
 Industrial Engineering 
 Materials Engineering
 Mechanical Engineering
 Petroleum Engineering
Telecommunication Engineering

Research Centres 
 Technology Consultancy Centre (TCC)
 The Brew-Hammond Energy Centre (TBHEC)
 Transport Research and Education Centre, Kumasi
 KNUST Engineering Project 
 KNUST-College of Engineering Innovation Centre

References

External links 
 Official Website

Engineering universities and colleges
Kwame Nkrumah University of Science and Technology